Video advertising encompasses online display advertisements that have video within them, but it is generally accepted that it refers to advertising that occurs  before, during and/or after a video stream on the internet.
 
The advertising units used in this instance are pre-roll, mid-roll, and post-roll and all of these ad units are like the traditional spot advertising you see on television, although often they are "cut-down" to be a shorter version than their TV counterparts if they are run online.

Broadcast websites such as Sky.com and itv.com have such advertising on their sites, as do newspaper websites such as The Telegraph, and The Guardian. In 2010, video ads accounted for 12.8% of all videos viewed and 1.2% of all minutes spent viewing video online.

In July 2014, Facebook paid an estimated $400 million to acquire LiveRail, a video advertising distributor which uses Real-time bidding to place more than 7 billion video ads a month.

Video ad formats
According to Interactive Advertising Bureau (IAB) guidelines, there are three types of video ad formats:
 Linear video ads — the ads are presented before, in the middle of, or after the video content is consumed by the user, in very much the same way a TV commercial can play before, during or after the chosen program.
 Non-linear video ads — the ads run concurrently with the video content, so the users see the ad while viewing the content.
 Companion ads — commonly text, display ads, rich media, or skins that wrap around the video experience.

See also
AdSense
Innovid
TubeMogul, Inc.
BrightRoll
Mixpo
YuMe
SpotXchange

References
 

Advertising
Streaming